The genetic history of the British Isles is the subject of research within the larger field of human population genetics. It has developed in parallel with DNA testing technologies capable of identifying genetic similarities and differences between both modern and ancient populations. The conclusions of population genetics regarding the British Isles in turn draw upon and contribute to the larger field of understanding the history of the human occupation of the area, complementing work in linguistics, archaeology, history and genealogy.

Research concerning the most important routes of migration into the British Isles is the subject of debate. Apart from the most obvious route across the narrowest point of the English Channel into Kent, other routes may have been important over the millennia, including a land bridge in the Mesolithic period, as well as maritime connections along the Atlantic coasts.

The periods of the most important migrations are contested. The Neolithic introduction of farming technologies from mainland Europe is frequently proposed as a period of major change in the British Isles. Such technology could either have been learned by locals from a small number of immigrants or have been introduced by colonists who significantly changed the population.

Other potentially important historical periods of migration that have been subject to consideration in this field include the introduction of Celtic languages and technologies (during the Bronze and Iron Ages), the Roman era, the period of Anglo-Saxon influx, the Viking era, the Norman invasion of 1066, and the era of the European wars of religion.

History of research

Early studies by Luigi Cavalli-Sforza used polymorphisms from proteins found within human blood (such as the ABO blood groups, Rhesus blood antigens, HLA loci, immunoglobulins, G6PD isoenzymes, amongst others). One of the lasting proposals of this study with regards to Europe is that within most of the continent the majority of genetic diversity may best be explained by immigration coming from the southeast towards the northwest or in other words from the Middle East towards Britain and Ireland. Cavalli-Sforza proposed at the time that the invention of agriculture might be the best explanation for this.

With the advent of DNA analysis modern populations were sampled for mitochondrial DNA to study the female line of descent and Y chromosome DNA to study male descent. As opposed to large scale sampling within the autosomal DNA, Y DNA and mitochondrial DNA represent specific types of genetic descent and can therefore reflect only particular aspects of past human movement. Later projects began to use autosomal DNA to gather a more complete picture of an individual's genome. For Britain, major research projects aimed at collecting data include the Oxford Genetic Atlas Project (OGAP) and more recently the People of the British Isles, also associated with Oxford.

Owing to the difficulty of modelling the contributions of historical migration events to modern populations based purely on modern genetic data, such studies often varied significantly in their conclusions. One early Y DNA study estimated a complete genetic replacement by the Anglo-Saxons, whilst another argued that it was impossible to distinguish between the contributions of the Anglo-Saxons and Vikings and that the contribution of the latter may even have been higher. A third study argued that there was no Viking influence on British populations at all outside Orkney. Stephen Oppenheimer and Bryan Sykes, meanwhile, claimed that the majority of the DNA in the British Isles had originated from a prehistoric migration from the Iberian peninsula and that subsequent invasions had had little genetic input.

In the last decade, improved technologies for extracting ancient DNA have allowed researchers to study the genetic impacts of these migrations in more detail. This led to Oppenheimer and Sykes' conclusions about the origins of the British being seriously challenged, since later research demonstrated that the majority of the DNA of much of continental Europe, including Britain and Ireland, is ultimately derived from Steppe invaders from the east rather than Iberia. This research has also suggested that subsequent migrations, such as that of the Anglo-Saxons, did have large genetic effects (though these effects varied from place to place).

Analyses of nuclear and ancient DNA

Paleolithic

After the Last Glacial Maximum, there is evidence of repopulation of Britain and Ireland during the late Upper Paleolithic from c. 13,500 BCE. Human skeletal remains from this period are rare. They include a female from Gough’s Cave, an individual who is genetically similar to the c. 15,000 year old individual ('Goyet-Q2') from Goyet Caves, Belgium. The female from Gough’s Cave carried mtDNA U8a, which is found in several individuals of the Magdalenian culture in Europe, but not in any other early ancient individuals from Britain. A second individual from Kendrick's Cave, a c. 12,000 BCE male, was found to be genetically similar to the Villabruna cluster, also known as Western Hunter-Gatherer ancestry. This ancestry is found in later British Mesolithic individuals. The Kendrick’s Cave individual's mtDNA U5a2 is also found in several British Mesolithic samples.

Mesolithic population
Mesolithic Britons were closely related to other Mesolithic people throughout Western Europe. This population probably had pale-coloured eyes, lactose intolerance, dark curly or wavy hair and dark to very dark skin.

Continental Neolithic farmers
The change to the Neolithic in the British Isles went along with a significant population shift. Neolithic individuals were close to Iberian and Central European Early and Middle Neolithic populations, modelled as having about 75% ancestry from Anatolian farmers with the rest coming from Western Hunter-Gatherers (WHG) in continental Europe. This suggests that farming was brought to the British Isles by sea from north-west mainland Europe, by a population that was, or became in succeeding generations, relatively large. In some regions, British Neolithic individuals had a small amount (about 10%) of WHG excess ancestry when compared with Iberian Early Neolithic farmers, suggesting that there was an additional gene flow from British Mesolithic hunter-gatherers into the newly arrived farmer population: while Neolithic individuals from Wales have no detectable admixture of local Western hunter-gatherer genes, those from South East England and Scotland show the highest additional admixture of local WHG genes, and those from South-West and Central England are intermediate.

Bronze Age European Bell Beaker People
According to Olalde et al. (2018), the spread of the Bell Beaker culture to Britain from the lower Rhine area in the early Bronze Age introduced high levels of steppe-related ancestry, resulting in a near-complete change of the local gene pool within a few centuries, replacing about 90% of the local Neolithic-derived lineages between 2,400 BC and 2,000 BC. These people exhibiting the Beaker culture were likely an offshoot of the Corded Ware culture, as they had little genetic affinity to the Iberian Beaker people. With the large steppe-derived component, they had a smaller proportion of continental Neolithic and Western Hunter Gatherer DNA. The Modern British and Irish likely derive most of their ancestry from this Beaker culture population. According to geneticist David Reich, southern Britain saw an increase in Neolithic DNA around the Iron Age to the Roman Period, which may be attributable to a resurgence of the native Neolithic-derived population or to Celtic Iron Age or Roman period migrations.

An earlier study had estimated that the modern English population derived somewhat just over half of their ancestry from a combination of Neolithic and Western Hunter Gatherer ancestry, with the steppe-derived (Yamnaya-like) element making up the remainder. Scotland was found to have both more Steppe and more Western Hunter Gatherer ancestry than England. These proportions are similar to other Northwest European populations.

Anglo-Saxons
Researchers have used ancient DNA to determine the nature of the Anglo-Saxon settlement, as well as its impact on modern populations in the British Isles.

One 2016 study, using Iron Age and Anglo-Saxon era DNA found at grave sites in Cambridgeshire, calculated that ten modern-day eastern English samples had 38% Anglo-Saxon ancestry on average whilst ten Welsh and Scottish samples each had 30% Anglo-Saxon ancestry, with a large statistical spread in all cases. However, the authors noted that the similarity observed between the various sample groups was possibly due to more recent internal migration.

Another 2016 study conducted using evidence from burials found in northern England found that a significant genetic difference was present in bodies from the Iron Age and the Roman period on the one hand and the Anglo-Saxon period on the other. Samples from modern-day Wales were found to be similar to those from the Iron Age and Roman burials whilst samples from much of modern England, East Anglia in particular, were closer to the Anglo-Saxon-era burial. This was found to demonstrate a "profound impact" from the Anglo-Saxon migrations on the modern English gene pool, though no specific percentages were given in the study.

A third study combined the ancient data from both of the preceding studies and compared it to a large number of modern samples from across Britain and Ireland. This study concluded that modern southern, central and eastern English populations were of "a predominantly Anglo-Saxon-like ancestry" whilst those from northern and southwestern England had a greater degree of indigenous origin.

A 2022 study focusing specifically on the question of the Anglo-Saxon settlement sampled 460 northwestern European individuals dated to the medieval period. The study concluded that in eastern England, large-scale immigration, including both men and women, occurred in the post-Roman era, with up to 76% of the ancestry of these individuals deriving from the North Sea coast area of continental Europe. The authors also noted that while a large proportion of the ancestry of the present-day English derives from the Anglo-Saxon migration event, it has been diluted by later migration from a population source similar to that of Iron Age France.

Vikings
Historical and toponymic evidence suggests a substantial Viking migration to many parts of northern Britain; however, particularly in the case of the Danish settlers, differentiating their genetic contribution to modern populations from that of the Anglo-Saxons has posed difficulties.

A study published in 2020, which used ancient DNA from across the Viking world in addition to modern data, noted that ancient samples from Denmark showed similarities to samples from both modern Denmark and modern England. Whilst most of this similarity was attributed to the earlier settlement of the Anglo-Saxons, the authors of the study noted that British populations also carried a small amount of "Swedish-like" ancestry that was present in the Danish Vikings but unlikely to have been associated with the Anglo-Saxons. From this, it was calculated that the modern English population has approximately 6% Danish Viking ancestry, with Scottish and Irish populations having up to 16%. Additionally, populations from all areas of Britain and Ireland were found to have 3–4% Norwegian Viking ancestry.

Irish populations
A 2015 study using data from the Neolithic and Bronze Ages showed a considerable genetic difference between individuals during the two periods, which was interpreted as being the result of a migration from the Pontic steppes. The individuals from the latter period, with significant steppe ancestry, showed strong similarities to modern Irish population groups. The study concluded that "these findings together suggest the establishment of central aspects of the Irish genome 4,000 years ago."

Another study, using modern autosomal data, found a large degree of genetic similarity between populations from northeastern Ireland, southern Scotland and Cumbria. This was interpreted as reflecting the legacy of the Plantation of Ulster in the 17th century.

Haplogroups

Mitochondrial DNA

Bryan Sykes broke mitochondrial results into twelve haplogroups for various regions of the isles:

Haplogroup H
Haplogroup I
Haplogroup J
Haplogroup T
Haplogroup V
Haplogroup W
Haplogroup X
Haplogroup U
...and within U...
Haplogroup U2
Haplogroup U3
Haplogroup U4
Haplogroup U5

Sykes found that the maternal haplogroup pattern was similar throughout England but with a distinct trend from east and north to west and south. Minor haplogroups were mainly found in the east of England. Sykes found Haplogroup H to be dominant in Ireland and Wales, though a few differences were found between north, mid and south Wales—there was a closer link between north and mid-Wales than either had with the south.

Studies of ancient DNA have demonstrated that ancient Britons and Anglo-Saxon settlers carried a variety of mtDNA haplogroups, though type H was common in both.

Y chromosome DNA

Sykes also designated five main Y-DNA haplogroups for various regions of Britain and Ireland.
Haplogroup R1b
Haplogroup R1a
Haplogroup I
Haplogroup E1b1b
Haplogroup J

Haplogroup R1b is dominant throughout Western Europe. While it was once seen as a lineage connecting Britain and Ireland to Iberia, where it is also common, it is now believed that both R1b and R1a entered Europe with Indo-European migrants likely originating around the Black Sea; R1a and R1b are now the most common haplotypes in Europe.

One common R1b subclade in Britain is R1b-U106, which reaches its highest frequencies in North Sea areas such as southern and eastern England, the Netherlands and Denmark. Due to its distribution, this subclade is often associated with the Anglo-Saxon migrations. Ancient DNA has shown that it was also present in Roman Britain, possibly among descendants of Germanic mercenaries.

Ireland, Scotland, Wales and northwestern England are dominated by R1b-L21, which is also found in northwestern France (Brittany), the north coast of Spain (Galicia), and western Norway. This lineage is often associated with the historic Celts, as most of the regions where it is predominant have had a significant Celtic language presence into the modern period and associate with a Celtic cultural identity in the present day. It was also present among Celtic Britons in eastern England prior to the Anglo-Saxon and Viking invasions, as well as Roman soldiers in York who were of native descent.

There are various smaller and geographically well-defined Y-DNA Haplogroups under R1b in Western Europe.

Haplogroup R1a, a close cousin of R1b, is most common in Eastern Europe. In Britain, it has been linked to Scandinavian immigration during periods of Viking settlement. 25% of men in Norway belong to this haplogroup; it is much more common in Norway than in the rest of Scandinavia. Around 9% of all Scottish men belong to the Norwegian R1a subclade, which peaks at over 30% in Shetland and Orkney.

Haplogroup I is a grouping of several quite distantly related lineages. Within Britain, the most common subclade is I1, which also occurs frequently in northwestern continental Europe and southern Scandinavia, and has thus been associated with the settlement of the Anglo-Saxons and Vikings. An Anglo-Saxon male from northern England who died between the seventh and tenth centuries was determined to have belonged to haplogroup I1.

Haplogroups E1b1b and J in Europe are regarded as markers of Neolithic movements from the Middle East to Southern Europe and likely to Northern Europe from there. These haplogroups are found most often in Southern Europe and North Africa. Both are rare in Northern Europe; E1b1b is found in 1% of Norwegian men, 1.5% of Scottish, 2% of English, 2.5% of Danish, 3% of Swedish and 5.5% of German. It reaches its peak in Europe in Kosovo at 47.5% and Greece at 30%.

Uncommon Y haplogroups
Geneticists have found that seven men with the surname Revis, which originates in Yorkshire, carry a genetic signature previously found only in people of West African origin. All of the men belonged to Haplogroup A1a (M31), a subclade of Haplogroup A which geneticists believe originated in Eastern or Southern Africa. The men are not regarded as phenotypically African and there are no documents, anecdotal evidence or oral traditions suggesting that the Revis family has African ancestry. It has been conjectured that the presence of this haplogroup may date from the Roman era when both Africans and Romans of African descent are known to have settled in Britain. According to Bryan Sykes, "although the Romans ruled from AD 43 until 410, they left a tiny genetic footprint." The genetics of some visibly white (European) people in England suggests that they are "descended from north African, Middle Eastern and Roman clans".

Geneticists have shown that former American president Thomas Jefferson, who might have been of Welsh descent, along with two other British men out of 85 British men with the surname Jefferson, carry the rare Y chromosome marker T (formerly called K2). This is typically found in East Africa and the Middle East. Haplogroup T is extremely rare in Europe but phylogenetic network analysis of its Y-STR (short tandem repeat) haplotype shows that it is most closely related to an Egyptian T haplotype, but the presence of scattered and diverse European haplotypes within the network is nonetheless consistent with Jefferson's patrilineage belonging to an ancient and rare indigenous European type.

See also

Prehistoric Britain
Historical immigration to Great Britain
Anglo-Saxon settlement of Britain
Nordic migration to Britain

List of haplogroups of historical and famous figures

Other locations:
Genetic history of the Middle East
Genetic history of indigenous peoples of the Americas
Genetic history of Europe
Genetic history of Italy
Genetics and archaeogenetics of South Asia

References

Bibliography

Further reading

 Gretzinger, J., Sayer, D., Justeau, P. et al. "The Anglo-Saxon migration and the formation of the early English gene pool". In: Nature (21 September 2022). https://doi.org/10.1038/s41586-022-05247-2

. Also here 
Malmström et al. 2009

Mithen, Steven 2003. After the Ice: A Global Human History 20,000-5000 BC. Phoenix (Orion Books Ltd.), London. 

Patterson, N., Isakov, M., Booth, T. et al. "Large-scale migration into Britain during the Middle to Late Bronze Age". Nature (2021). Large-scale migration into Britain during the Middle to Late Bronze Age

Stringer, Chris. 2006. Homo Britannicus. Penguin Books Ltd., London. .

History of the British Isles
Human population genetics
British Isles